Marten Van Riel (born 15 December 1992) is a Belgian triathlete.

Biography
Van Riel was born in Loenhout, Antwerp. He competed in the men's event at the 2016 Summer Olympics. He ended sixth. In 2018, he won bronze medals at the 2018 European Triathlon Championships in the men's individual and mixed team relay events.

In 2019, he won the silver medal in the men's triathlon at the 2019 Military World Games held in Wuhan, China.

Van Riel also competes in Super League Triathlon. He won both of the Super League Triathlon Arena Games races in 2021.

In March 2022, Marten Van Riel won the Ironman 70.3 in Dubaï. He complete the race in 3h27'40.

References

External links
 

1992 births
Living people
Belgian male triathletes
Olympic triathletes of Belgium
Triathletes at the 2016 Summer Olympics
Sportspeople from Antwerp Province
Triathletes at the 2020 Summer Olympics